Abdolreza Alizadeh (born 19 February 1987 in Urmia)  is a volleyball player from Iran, who plays as a libero for Haraz Amol and the Men's National Team in the 2010 FIVB Men's World Championship and 2014 FIVB Volleyball World League.

Honours

National team
Asian Championship
Silver medal (1): 2009
AVC Cup
Gold medal (1):2010
World Junior Championship
Bronze medal (1): 2007
Asian Junior Championship
Gold medal (1): 2006
Asian Youth Championship
Gold medal (1): 2005

Individual
Best Libero: 2005 Asian Youth Championship
Best Libero: 2010 AVC Cup

References

1987 births
Living people
Iranian men's volleyball players
People from Urmia